Lisa Stahl, sometimes credited as Lisa Stahl-Sullivan is an American model, actress and game show host.

Early life
She was born in Miami, Florida, graduating from North Miami High School and was a former cheerleader for the Miami Dolphins.

Career
Stahl was a model throughout the 1980s and 1990s.

In the world of television game shows, she was one of the featured models on the nighttime version of The New Price Is Right.

As an actress, she appeared in multiple movies such as Heart Condition, with Denzel Washington, Jerry Maguire with Tom Cruise, the Disney films The Thirteenth Year, and Safety Patrol, Calendar Girl with Jason Priestley, My Life, with Michael Keaton, and Nicole Kidman, and TV series Baywatch and was one of the 5 main main cast of Baywatch Nights as regular character Destiny Desimone. Beyond her role on Baywatch and Baywatch Nights, Stahl was featured in TV shows such as Silk Stalkings NYPD Blue, Murphy Brown, Moonlighting, Married... with Children and Ellen (TV series). She was featured in the 1984 George Michael video "Careless Whisper", as the scorned girlfriend, who takes off on a plane and leaves Michael stranded at the harbor staring up at her, and pleading for her return.

Stahl was the co presenter of the Florida Lottery show in the late 1990's

Stahl currently runs Sullivan Studios, a photographic studio (established in 1996) in Los Angeles. Clients have included Elton John, Prince, Mary J. Blige, Fugees, Pierce Brosnan, Rod Stewart, Jessica Simpson, and many others. Stahl Sullivan just completed her fourth year as FreemantleMedia’s exclusive photographer for American Idol, and has also worked on such game shows as The New Price Is Right, Family Feud, Press Your Luck, Flamingo Fortune, Celebrity Duets and America's Got Talent.

Filmography

References

 Nancy Imperiale-Wellons, "Lottery's Lisa Stahl Sullivan Is A Baywatch Alum", Orlando Sentinel, September 20, 1998
 
 
 Q Magazine, June, 2009

Further reading

External links 

Living people
American film actresses
American television actresses
American game show hosts
Game show models
National Football League cheerleaders
Actresses from Miami  
20th-century American actresses
21st-century American actresses
1965 births
Disney people